Mr Gay UK is a British annual beauty contest for gay men, with regional heats held in gay nightclubs with a grand final usually at a gay venue.

It began in 1982 as "Mr Hardware" (named after a fragrance) designed to promote a gay mail order company. The event, held in the Heaven nightclub, was filmed by the BBC as part of a documentary entitled Something For the Ladies.

In 1984, the competition name was changed to Mr Gay UK. Since then, the event has been recorded for video release (1993), featured on a Channel 4 series, Passengers (1994) and the event itself was broadcast on Five in 1998 and 1999.

In 2008 the first winner of the contest, Anthony Morley, was convicted of murder and cannibalism.

Mr Gay UK winners

Since 2005, the winner has gone on to represent the UK in Mr Gay Europe.

2011 contest
As with previous years, heats for the 2011 contest were held in various gay venues across the country. Participants could apply in advance directly with the venue, or just turn up on the evening and complete an application form. In total there are 14 finalists from the heats that took place between September and October 2011.

Voting
In this year the rules and the feeling of the competition were changed. A public vore was put into place and contestants were expected to campaign for votes in any way they could. Each finalist could receive votes through a premium rate phone and text number, a 'like' on their individual Facebook page and a Twitter and E-mail vote accessible from the main Mr Gay UK website. Voting ended on 29 November 2011 and the five finalists were announced. They were Greg Lumley – Middlesbrough, Charlie Drummond – Bristol, John Wheeldon – Leeds, Nik Chapman – Newcastle and Samuel Kneen – Cardiff, who eventually went on to win the competition

Promotion
A media relations push was made on the competition with articles appearing in local and regional media and radio, but also had national coverage in guardian.co.uk and the three of finalists appeared on Loose Women bringing on Julie Goodyear.

The Final 
The grand final was held on Saturday 10 December at Mission 2 in Leeds. Judges included Kieron Richardson from Hollyoaks, Rob Gunn from the competition's sponsor Manhunt and photographer Jay Eff.

Hosts
Presenters have included Dannii Minogue, Lily Savage, Jason Donovan, Mark Little, Robbie Williams, Jane McDonald, Terry George (entrepreneur), Richard Newman, Nadia Almada, Brian Dowling and Philip Olivier and judges have included Jean Paul Gaultier, Michael Cashman, Danny La Rue, Scott Neal, Lea Walker, Jonathan Kerrigan, Su Pollard and Christopher Biggins. In 2007, the presenters were Andy Scott-Lee and his wife Michelle Heaton. The judges were Shahbaz from Big Brother 2006, James Sutton of Hollyoaks, long-standing Adam Lowe of Bent magazine and The Sheilas of Sheilas' Wheels. The event was hosted at Flamingo's nightclub in Blackpool, where Daniel Broughton (also from Blackpool) won.

Notable contestants

Mr Gay 2001, Carl Austin-Behan, became the 119th Lord Mayor of Manchester in 2016, serving until 2017.

Mr Gay UK 2003, Jarrold Batchelor, went on to appear in the Channel 4 reality series, The Games.

In 2006, police officer Mark Carter made national headlines when he won the competition.

Mr Gay UK 1998, Ben Harris, became the winner of the Channel 4 show Playing It Straight in 2004.

Mr Gay UK 2007, Daniel Broughton, entered the modelling industry, modelling for some of the top mainstream companies around the world. He joined the British Army in 2016, after the death of his younger brother, who was KIA – Afghanistan, Herrick 18. He is still currently serving.

Mr Gay Newcastle 2007, Charlie Drummond, became a Big Brother housemate in the 2009 series, where he sparked an "are they?/aren't they" relationship with fellow bisexual housemate Rodrigo Lopes. He made it to the final, finishing in 4th place. Drummond later went on to become Mr Gay Bristol 2011.

Mr UK 2010 finalist, Calum William Kieth Owen, has gone on to compete in further pageants and earned himself the title of Mister Supernational Manchester in 2011 and won the Best Hair heat.

Mr Gay UK winner 2011, Samuel Kneen, made headlines by donating prize money to HIV charity Terrence Higgins Trust.

Mr Gay UK winner 2013, Stuart Hatton, is noted as the most successful 'Mr Gay' as he went on to represent the United Kingdom in Austria at Mr Gay Europe and was second runner up. Two months later Hatton travelled to Rome, Italy to represent the United Kingdom once more as Mr Gay UK but this time at The Mr Gay World Contest where he won the Mr Gay World title and therefore becoming the first ever United Kingdom winner to receive the global award.
In 2014 Hatton was awarded the Mr Gay UK Title for a 2nd year for his LGBTI Activist roles. Making him the only ever man to hold the Mr Gay UK title for two years. 
He is the founder of the anti bullying and homophobia awareness campaign 'So What' The mission statement being, "Some of us have green eyes, some of us have blue eyes, some of us are straight, some of us are gay.. SO WHAT!" The campaigns asks for supporters of all different ages, nationalities and sexualities to upload selfies of themselves to social media platforms, with the words 'So What' written on the palms of their hands to help battle homophobia around the world.
Hatton has appeared on the cover of many worldwide Gay Magazines.

See also

 Mr Gay Europe

References

External links
 

LGBT events in the United Kingdom
Beauty pageants in the United Kingdom
1982 establishments in the United Kingdom
Recurring events established in 1982
LGBT beauty pageants
Annual events in the United Kingdom
Gay events
Male beauty pageants
Men in the United Kingdom
British awards
Mr Gay World